Anurak Chompoopruk  (born 5 October 1988) is a Thai professional footballer who plays as a goalkeeper for Thai League 1 club Sukhothai.

References

External links

1988 births
Living people
Anurak Chompoopruk
Anurak Chompoopruk
Association football goalkeepers
Anurak Chompoopruk
Anurak Chompoopruk
Anurak Chompoopruk
Anurak Chompoopruk
Anurak Chompoopruk
Anurak Chompoopruk
Anurak Chompoopruk
Anurak Chompoopruk